Richard H. Frank is an American entertainment executive who served  chairman of Walt Disney Television and Telecommunications (1994 to 1995) and as president of the Disney Studios (1985 to 1994).

Career
Richard Frank was president of the Paramount Television Group in 1985. became president of Disney Studios under chair Jeffrey Katzenberg starting 1985. In August 1994 with the departure of Disney Studios chair Jeffrey Katzenberg,  its filmed entertainment business, Disney Studios, was split into two, with the newly created Walt Disney Television and Telecommunications under Frank as chair. At the end of his contract on April 30, 1995, Frank left Disney.

Frank currently owns Frank Family Vineyards, a Napa Valley winery with four estate vineyards,  and sits on the board of eco-friendly goods firm TerraCycle. In October 2009, Frank invested in and took a seat on the board of mobile marketing and advertising venture The Hyperfactory.

References

External links
 http://www.frankfamilyvineyards.com
 

Year of birth missing (living people)
Living people
American film studio executives
American television executives
Disney executives
Gies College of Business alumni
University of Illinois Urbana-Champaign alumni